This list of the Cenozoic life of South Dakota contains the various prehistoric life-forms whose fossilized remains have been reported from within the US state of South Dakota and are between 66 million and 10,000 years of age.

A

 †Adeloblarina
 †Adeloblarina berklandi – or unidentified comparable form
 †Adjidaumo
 †Adjidaumo lophatus
 †Adjidaumo minutus
  †Aelurodon
 †Aelurodon ferox
 †Aelurodon taxoides
 †Aepinacodon
 †Aepinacodon deflectus – type locality for species
  †Aepycamelus
 †Agnotocastor
 †Agnotocastor coloradensis
 †Agnotocastor praetereadens – type locality for species
  †Agriochoerus
 †Agriochoerus antiquus
 †Agriochoerus gaudryi – type locality for species
 †Alilepus – tentative report
 †Alismaphyllites
 †Alismaphyllites grandifolius
 †Allantodiopsis
 †Allantodiopsis erosa
 Alligator
  †Alligator prenasalis – type locality for species
 †Allomys
 †Allomys harkseni
 †Allomys storeri – type locality for species
 †Allophaiomys
 †Allophaiomys pliocaenicus
 †Alwoodia
 †Ambystoma
 †Ambystoma minshalli
 †Ambystoma tigrinum
  †Amebelodon
 †Ameiseophis
 †Ameiseophis robinsoni
 †Ampelopsis
 †Ampelopsis acerifolia
 †Amphechinus
 †Amphechinus horncloudi
 †Amphicaenopus
 †Amphicaenopus platycephalus – type locality for species
 †Amynodontopsis
 †Amynodontopsis bodei
  †Anchitherium
 †Anchitherium clarencei
 †Ansomys
 †Ansomys cyanotephrus – type locality for species
 Antilocapra
 †Antilocapra americana
 Apalone
 †Apalone leucopotamica
  †Aphelops
 †Aphelops megalodus
 †Apternodus
 †Apternodus mediaevus
 †Archaeocyon
 †Archaeocyon leptodus
 †Archaeocyon pavidus
 †Archaeohippus
 †Archaeohippus blackbergi – or unidentified comparable form
 †Archaeolagus
 †Archaeolagus macrocephalus – type locality for species
 †Archaeolagus primigenius – type locality for species
  †Archaeotherium
 †Archaeotherium lemleyi – type locality for species
 †Archaeotherium marshi – type locality for species
 †Archaeotherium mortoni
 †Archaeotherium trippensis – type locality for species
  †Arctodus
 †Arctodus simus
 †Arctonasua
 †Arretotherium
 †Arretotherium fricki
 †Arretotherium leptodus – type locality for species
 Azolla
 †Azolla schopfi – type locality for species

B

  †Barbourofelis
 †Barbourofelis whitfordi
 †Barbouromeryx
 †Barbouromeryx trigonocorneus
 †Bathornis
 †Bathornis celeripes
 †Bathornis veredus
 Bison
  †Bison latifrons
 Blarina
 †Blarina carolinensis – or unidentified comparable form
 †Boochoerus
 †Boochoerus angustus – type locality for species
  †Bothriodon
 †Bothriodon americanus – type locality for species
 †Bothriodon rostratus
 †Brachyerix
 †Brachyerix incertis – or unidentified comparable form
 †Brachygaulus – or unidentified comparable form
 †Brachypsalis
 †Brachypsalis modicus
  †Brachyrhynchocyon
 †Brachyrhynchocyon dodgei
 †Brontops
 †Brontops bicornutus
 †Brontops brachycephalus
 †Brontops dispar
 †Brontops robustus – type locality for species
 †Brontops tyleri – type locality for species
 Bufo
 †Bufo pliocompactilis
 †Bufo woodhousei
 Buteo
 †Buteo grangeri – type locality for species

C

 †Calamagras
 †Calamagras angulatus
 †Calamagras weigeli
 †Calippus
 †Calippus martini
 †Calippus placidus
  †Camelops
 Canis
  †Canis dirus – or unidentified comparable form
 †Canis latrans
 †Canis lupus
 †Capacikala
 †Capacikala parvus
 †Capatanka
 †Capatanka gaulodon
 †Capatanka minor
 †Carpocyon
 †Carpocyon robustus
 Castor
 †Castor canadensis – or unidentified comparable form
 †Castor peninsulatus
 †Catostomus
  Celtis
 †Centetodon
 †Centetodon magnus
 †Centetodon marginalis
 †Centetodon wolffi
 Cercidiphyllum
 †Cercidiphyllum arcticum
  Charina
 †Charina prebottae
 Chrysemys
 †Chrysemys antiqua
 †Clinopternodus
 †Clinopternodus gracilis
 Cnemidophorus
 †Colodon
 †Colodon cingulatus
 †Colodon occidentalis
 †Copemys
 †Copemys longidens
 †Coprophis – type locality for genus
 †Coprophis dakotaensis – type locality for species
  †Cormocyon
 †Cormocyon haydeni – type locality for species
  †Cormohipparion
 †Cormohipparion fricki
 †Cormohipparion quinni
  †Cosoryx
 †Cosoryx furcatus
  †Cranioceras
 †Cranioceras unicornis
 Crotalus
 †Crucimys
 †Crucimys milleri
 †Cupidinimus
 †Cupidinimus smaragdinus – type locality for species
 †Cymaprimadon
 †Cymaprimadon kenni – type locality for species
 †Cynarctoides
 †Cynarctoides acridens
 †Cynarctoides lemur
 †Cynarctoides roii
 †Cynarctus
 †Cynarctus crucidens
 †Cynodesmus
 †Cynodesmus thooides
 Cynomys

D

 †Dakotallomys
 †Dakotallomys lillegraveni
 †Dakotallomys pelycomyoides
 †Dakotaophis – type locality for genus
 †Dakotaophis greeni – type locality for species
  †Daphoenus
 †Daphoenus hartshornianus
 †Daphoenus vetus
 †Dendrochen – type locality for genus
 †Dendrochen robusta – type locality for species
 †Desmathyus
 †Desmathyus pinensis
 †Desmatippus
 †Desmatippus texanus
 †Desmatochoerus
 †Desmatochoerus megalodon
 †Desmocyon
 †Desmocyon thomsoni
  †Diceratherium
 †Diceratherium annectens
 †Diceratherium armatum – type locality for species
 †Diceratherium radtkei
 †Diceratherium tridactylum – type locality for species
 †Dikkomys
 †Dikkomys matthewi
  †Dinictis
 †Dinictis felina
  †Dinohyus
 †Dipoides
 †Disallomys
 †Disallomys robustus
 †Domnina
 †Domnina dakotensis – type locality for species
 †Domnina gradata
 †Domnina greeni – type locality for species
 †Domninoides
 †Domninoides riparensis – type locality for species
 †Douglassciurus
 †Douglassciurus bjorki – type locality for species
 †Downsimus
 †Downsimus chadwicki – type locality for species
 †Duchesnehippus
 †Duchesnehippus intermedius
  †Duchesneodus
 †Duchesneodus uintensis

E

 †Ectopocynus
 †Ectopocynus antiquus
 †Ekgmowechashala
 †Ekgmowechashala philotau – type locality for species
 Elaphe
 †Elaphe nebraskensis
 †Elaphe vulpina
  †Elomeryx
 †Elomeryx armatus – type locality for species
 †Elomeryx garbanii – type locality for species
 †Enhydrocyon
 †Enhydrocyon crassidens – type locality for species
 †Enhydrocyon pahinsintewakpa
  †Entelodon
 †Entelodon coarctatus – or unidentified comparable form
 †Entoptychus
 †Entoptychus leptophrys
  †Eopelobates
 †Eopelobates grandis – type locality for species
 †Epeiromys
 †Epicyon
 †Epicyon saevus
 Equus
 †Equus francisci
 †Equus giganteus – or unidentified comparable form
 †Etheostoma
  †Eubelodon
 †Eubelodon morrilli
 †Eucastor
 †Eucastor tortus
 †Eucommia
 †Eucommia serrata
 Eumeces
 †Eumeces septentrionalis
 †Eumys
 †Eumys brachyodus
 †Eumys elegans
  †Eusmilus
 †Eusmilus sicarius
 †Eutypomys
 †Eutypomys montanensis – or unidentified comparable form
 †Eutypomys thomsoni – type locality for species
 †Eutypomys wilsoni – or unidentified comparable form

F

  Ficus
 †Ficus artocarpoides
 †Ficus subtruncata
 †Florentiamys
 †Florentiamys agnewi – type locality for species
 †Florentiamys tiptoni
 †Fossorcastor
 †Fossorcastor brachyceps

G

 †Galbreathia
 †Galbreathia novellus
 Geomys
 †Geringia
 †Geringia gloveri
 †Geringia mcgregori
 †Gigantocamelus
 †Gigantocamelus spatulus
  Glyptostrobus
 †Glyptostrobus nordenskioldi
  †Gomphotherium
 †Gomphotherium obscurum
 †Grangerimus
 †Grangerimus dakotensis
  Graptemys
 †Gregorymys
 †Gregorymys curtus – type locality for species
 †Gregorymys formosus – type locality for species
 †Gripholagomys – type locality for genus
 †Gripholagomys lavocati – type locality for species
 †Guildayomys
 †Guildayomys hibbardi – or unidentified comparable form

H

 †Haplomys
 †Haplomys galbreathi – type locality for species
 †Heliscomys
 †Heliscomys senex
 †Hemiauchenia
  †Hemicyon
 †Hemicyon barbouri
 †Heptacodon
 †Heptacodon curtus – type locality for species
 †Heptacodon gibbiceps – type locality for species
 †Heptacodon occidentale
  †Herpetotherium
 †Herpetotherium fugax
 †Herpetotherium youngi
  †Hesperocyon
 †Hesperocyon gregarius
 †Hesperolagomys – tentative report
 †Hesperopetes
 †Hesperopetes blacki – type locality for species
 †Hesperopetes jamesi – type locality for species
 †Hesperotestudo
 †Hesperotestudo niobrarensis
 Heterodon
 †Heteromeryx
 †Heteromeryx dispar – type locality for species
 †Hibbarderix
 †Hibbarderix obfuscatus
 †Hibbardomys
 †Hibbardomys marthae – or unidentified comparable form
 †Hibbardomys zakrzewskii
  †Hipparion
 †Hipparion tehonense
  †Hippotherium
 †Hippotherium dolichops – type locality for species
 †Hitonkala
 †Hitonkala andersontau – type locality for species
  †Homotherium – or unidentified comparable form
 †Hoplophoneus
 †Hoplophoneus cerebralis
 †Hoplophoneus mentalis
 †Hoplophoneus occidentalis
 †Hoplophoneus primaevus
  †Hyaenodon
 †Hyaenodon brevirostrus – type locality for species
 †Hyaenodon crucians
 †Hyaenodon horridus
 †Hyaenodon montanus – or unidentified comparable form
 †Hyaenodon mustelinus – type locality for species
 Hyla
 †Hypertragulus
 †Hypertragulus calcaratus
 †Hypertragulus dakotensis – type locality for species
 †Hypisodus
 †Hypisodus minimus
  †Hypohippus
 †Hypolagus
 †Hypolagus fontinalis – type locality for species
 †Hypolagus vetus – or unidentified comparable form
 †Hyporhina – type locality for genus
 †Hyporhina antiqua – type locality for species
 †Hyracodon
 †Hyracodon leidyanus – type locality for species
 †Hyracodon nebraskensis
 †Hyracodon priscidens – or unidentified comparable form

I

  Ictalurus
 †Ischyrocyon
 †Ischyrocyon gidleyi
  †Ischyromys
 †Ischyromys typus

J

 †Javazapus
 †Javazapus weeksi

K

 †Kirkomys
 †Kirkomys martintau
 †Kirkomys nebraskensis

L

 †Lambdoceras
 †Lambdoceras hessei – type locality for species
 Lampropeltis
 †Lampropeltis similis
 †Leidymys
 †Leidymys blacki
 †Leidymys juxtaparvulus
 Lepisosteus
  Lepomis
 †Leptarctus
 †Leptarctus primus – type locality for species
  †Leptauchenia
 †Leptauchenia decora – type locality for species
 †Leptauchenia major – type locality for species
  †Leptictis
 †Leptictis dakotensis
 †Leptictis haydeni
 †Leptochoerus
 †Leptochoerus elegans
 †Leptochoerus supremus – type locality for species
  †Leptocyon
 †Leptocyon delicatus – type locality for species
 †Leptocyon douglassi
 †Leptocyon gregorii
 †Leptocyon matthewi
 †Leptocyon vafer – or unidentified comparable form
 †Leptocyon vulpinus
  †Leptomeryx
 †Leptomeryx evansi
 †Leptoromys
 †Leptoromys wilsoni – type locality for species
 Lepus
 †Lepus americanus – or unidentified comparable form
 †Lepus ennisianus – or unidentified comparable form
 †Lignimus
 †Lignimus austridakotensis – type locality for species
 †Limnoecus
 †Limnoecus compressus – or unidentified comparable form
 †Limnoecus niobrarensis
 †Longirostromeryx
 †Longirostromeryx wellsi – type locality for species

M

 †Macrogenis
 †Macrogenis crassigenis
 †Macrognathomys
 †Macrognathomys gemmacolis – type locality for species
 †Macrorhineura – type locality for genus
 †Macrorhineura skinneri – type locality for species
 †Mammacyon
 †Mammacyon obtusidens – type locality for species
 †Mammuthus
  †Mammuthus columbi
†Mammuthus primigenius
 †Manitsha – type locality for genus
 †Manitsha tanka – type locality for species
 Martes
 †Martes campestris
  †Megacerops
 †Megacerops coloradensis
 †Megacerops curtus
 †Megachoerus – tentative report
 †Megachoerus latidens – type locality for species
 †Megalagus
 †Megalagus primitivus – or unidentified comparable form
 †Megalagus turgidus
 †Megaleptictis
 †Megaleptictis altidens
  †Megalictis
 †Megalictis ferox – type locality for species
 †Megalonyx
  †Megalonyx leptostomus
 †Megalonyx wheatleyi
 †Megapaloelodus – type locality for genus
 †Megapaloelodus connectens – type locality for species
 †Megasminthus
 †Megasminthus gladiofex – type locality for species
 †Megasminthus tiheni
 †Megoreodon
 †Megoreodon grandis
 †Meniscomys
 †Meniscomys hippodus
  †Menoceras
 †Menoceras barbouri
 †Menops
 †Menops marshi
 †Menops serotinus
 †Menops walcotti
  †Merychippus
 †Merychippus insignis
 †Merychyus
 †Merychyus arenarum
 †Merychyus minimus
 †Merychyus novomexicanus
  †Merycochoerus
 †Merycochoerus chelydra
 †Merycochoerus matthewi – type locality for species
 †Merycodus
 †Merycodus major – or unidentified comparable form
 †Merycodus necatus
 †Merycoides
 †Merycoides longiceps
 †Merycoides pariogonus – or unidentified comparable form
 †Merycoidodon
 †Merycoidodon bullatus – type locality for species
 †Merycoidodon culbertsoni – type locality for species
 †Merycoidodon major
  †Mesocyon
 †Mesocyon temnodon
  †Mesohippus
 †Mesohippus bairdi
 †Mesohippus exoletus
  †Mesoreodon
 †Mesoreodon chelonyx
 †Mesoreodon minor
 †Mesoscalops
  †Metamynodon
 †Metamynodon chadronensis – type locality for species
 †Metamynodon planifrons
 †Michenia
 †Michenia exilis
 Microtus
 †Microtus meadensis
 †Microtus paroperarius
 Mictomys
 †Mictomys kansasensis
 †Mimomys
 †Mimomys dakotaensis
  †Miniochoerus
 †Miniochoerus affinis
 †Miniochoerus forsythae
 †Miniochoerus gracilis
 †Miniochoerus starkensis – type locality for species
 †Mioheteromys
 †Mioheteromys arcarius
  †Miohippus
 †Miohippus annectens – type locality for species
 †Miohippus equiceps
 †Miohippus equinanus
 †Miohippus gemmarosae – or unidentified comparable form
 †Miohippus gidleyi – type locality for species
 †Miohippus grandis
 †Miohippus intermedius – type locality for species
 †Miohippus obliquidens – type locality for species
 †Mionictis
 †Mionictis pristinus
 †Miortyx – type locality for genus
 †Miortyx teres – type locality for species
 †Miospermophilus – or unidentified comparable form
 †Monosaulax
 †Monosaulax curtus – or unidentified comparable form
  †Moropus
 Mustela
 †Mustelavus
 †Mustelavus priscus – type locality for species
 †Mylagaulus
 †Mylagaulus sesquipedalis – or unidentified comparable form
 †Mystipterus
 †Mystipterus martini – or unidentified comparable form

N

  †Nannippus
 †Nanotragulus
 †Nanotragulus loomisi
 †Nanotragulus ordinatus – type locality for species
 †Nelumbago
 †Nelumbago montanum
  †Neohipparion – type locality for genus
 †Neohipparion affine – type locality for species
 †Neonatrix
 †Neonatrix elongata
 Neotoma
 †Neotoma amplidonta – type locality for species
 Nerodia
 †Nerodia sipedon
 Nettion
 †Nettion greeni – type locality for species
 †Nexuotapirus
 †Nexuotapirus marslandensis
 †Niglarodon
 †Niglarodon koerneri
  †Nimravus
 †Nimravus sectator – type locality for species
 †Nothodipoides
 †Nothodipoides planus
 Notophthalmus
 †Notophthalmus crassus – type locality for species
 †Nototamias
 †Nototamias quadratus
  †Notropis
 †Noturus – tentative report

O

 †Ocajila
 †Ocajila makpiyahe – type locality for species
 †Octacodon
 †Octacodon valens – type locality for species
 †Ogmophis
 †Ogmophis miocompactus – type locality for species
 †Oligoryctes
 †Oligoryctes altitalonidus
 †Oligoscalops
 †Oligoscalops galbreathi
 †Oligospermophilus
 †Oligotheriomys
 †Oligotheriomys magnus – type locality for species
 Ondatra
 †Ondatra annectens
 Onychomys
 †Onychomys pedroensis
 †Oreodontoides
 †Oreodontoides oregonensis
  Ortalis
 †Ortalis pollicaris – type locality for species
 †Osbornodon
 †Osbornodon sesnoni
 †Otarocyon
 †Otarocyon cooki
 †Otarocyon macdonaldi – type locality for species
 †Oxetocyon
 †Oxetocyon cuspidatus – type locality for species
  †Oxydactylus
 †Oxydactylus lacota – type locality for species
 †Oxydactylus wyomingensis – or unidentified comparable form

P

 †Paciculus
 †Paciculus cedrus – type locality for species
 †Paciculus montanus – or unidentified comparable form
 †Paciculus nebraskensis – or unidentified comparable form
 †Paciculus woodi
 †Palaeoborus
 †Palaeoborus rosatus – type locality for species
   †Palaeocastor
 †Palaeocastor peninsulatus
 †Palaeocastor wahlerti
  †Palaeogale
 †Palaeogale dorothiae – type locality for species
 †Palaeogale sectoria
  †Palaeolagus
 †Palaeolagus burkei
 †Palaeolagus haydeni
 †Palaeolagus hypsodus
 †Palaeolagus intermedius
 †Palaeolagus philoi – type locality for species
 †Palaeonossax – type locality for genus
 †Palaeonossax senectus – type locality for species
 †Paleoheterodon
 †Paleoheterodon tiheni
 †Parablastomeryx
 †Parablastomeryx gregorii
 †Paracrax
 †Paracrax gigantea – type locality for species
 †Paracrax wetmorei – type locality for species
 †Paradaphoenus
 †Paradaphoenus minimus
 †Paradaphoenus tooheyi – type locality for species
 †Paradjidaumo
 †Paradjidaumo trilophus
 †Paraenhydrocyon
 †Paraenhydrocyon robustus
  †Parahippus
 †Parahippus cognatus – or unidentified comparable form
 †Parahippus pawniensis
 †Parahippus pristinus – type locality for species
 †Paramerychyus
 †Paramerychyus harrisonensis
 †Paramerychyus relictus
 †Paramys
 †Paramys relictus
 †Paranymphaea
 †Paranymphaea crassifolia
 †Paranyroca – type locality for genus
 †Paranyroca magna – type locality for species
 †Parapliosaccomys
 †Parapliosaccomys hibbardi – or unidentified related form
 †Paratomarctus
 †Paratomarctus euthos
  †Paratylopus
 †Paratylopus labiatus
 †Parictis
 †Parictis dakotensis – type locality for species
 †Parictis gilpini – type locality for species
 †Parictis major – type locality for species
 †Parictis parvus – type locality for species
 †Parvericius
 †Parvericius montanus
  †Peltosaurus
 †Peltosaurus granulosus
 †Pelycomys
 †Pelycomys placidus
 †Penetrigonias
 †Penetrigonias dakotensis
 †Peraceras
 †Peraceras superciliosum
 †Perchoerus
 †Perchoerus minor
 †Perchoerus nanus
 †Perchoerus probus – or unidentified comparable form
 Perognathus
 †Perognathus brevidens
 †Perognathus coquorum – or unidentified comparable form
 †Perognathus trojectioansrum
 Peromyscus
 †Philotrox
 †Philotrox condoni
  †Phlaocyon
 †Phlaocyon minor
 Phrynosoma
 †Phrynosoma douglassi
 †Planera
 †Planera raynoldsi
  †Platygonus
 †Plesiosorex
 †Plesiosorex coloradensis
 †Plesiosorex donroosai – type locality for species
 †Pleurolicus
 †Pleurolicus clasoni
 †Pleurolicus dakotensis – type locality for species
 †Pleurolicus sulcifrons
 †Pliauchenia
 †Pliauchenia magnifontis
 †Pliogale
 †Pliogale manka
  †Pliohippus
 †Pliohippus pernix
 †Pliophenacomys
 †Pliophenacomys osborni – or unidentified comparable form
 †Pliosaccomys
 †Pliosaccomys dubius – or unidentified comparable form
  †Poebrotherium
 †Poebrotherium wilsoni
  †Pogonodon
 †Pogonodon brachyops
 †Pogonodon cismontanus – type locality for species
 †Pogonodon eileenae
 †Problastomeryx
 †Problastomeryx primus
  †Procamelus
 †Procamelus grandis
 †Procastoroides
 †Procastoroides sweeti – or unidentified comparable form
 †Procrax – type locality for genus
 †Procrax brevipes – type locality for species
 †Prodipodomys
 †Prodipodomys idahoensis
 †Prodipoides
 †Prodipoides dividerus
 †Proharrymys
 †Proharrymys fedti – type locality for species
 †Proharrymys schlaikjeri
 †Proharrymys wahlerti
 †Proheteromys
 †Proheteromys gremmelsi – type locality for species
 †Proheteromys ironcloudi – type locality for species
 †Proheteromys matthewi – type locality for species
 †Promartes
 †Promartes gemmarosae
 †Promartes lepidus – type locality for species
 †Promartes olcotti
   †Promerycochoerus
 †Promerycochoerus carrikeri
 †Promerycochoerus superbus
 †Promylagaulus
 †Promylagaulus riggsi – type locality for species
 †Proscalops
 †Proscalops evelynae – type locality for species
 †Proscalops secundus
 †Proscalops tertius
 †Prosciurus
 †Prosciurus dawsonae
 †Prosthennops
 †Prosthennops niobrarensis – or unidentified comparable form
   †Protapirus
 †Protapirus obliquidens – type locality for species
 †Protapirus simplex – type locality for species
 †Proterix
 †Proterix bicuspis
 †Proterix loomisi
  †Protoceras
 †Protoceras celer
 †Protoceras skinneri – type locality for species
 †Protohippus
 †Protohippus supremus – type locality for species
 †Protolabis
 †Protolabis heterodontus
 †Protospermophilus
 Pseudacris
 †Pseudacris clarki – or unidentified comparable form
  †Pseudaelurus
 †Pseudhipparion
 †Pseudhipparion gratum
 †Pseudhipparion retrusum
 †Pseudoblastomeryx
 †Pseudoblastomeryx advena
 †Pseudograptemys
 †Pseudograptemys inornata – type locality for species
  †Pseudoprotoceras
 †Pseudoprotoceras longinaris
 †Pseudoprotoceras minor
 †Pseudotheridomys
 †Pseudotrimylus
 †Pseudotrimylus dakotensis
 †Pterogaulus
 †Pterygoboa – type locality for genus
 †Pterygoboa miocenica – type locality for species

Q

 †Quadrodens
 †Quadrodens wilsoni – type locality for species
 Querquedula
 †Querquedula integra – type locality for species

R

 †Rana
  †Rana catesbeiana
 †Rana pipiens
 Reithrodontomys
 †Reithrodontomys moorei
  Rhineura
 †Rhineura hatcherii – type locality for species
 †Rhineura sepultura – type locality for species
 †Russellagus
 †Russellagus vonhofi – or unidentified comparable form

S

 Salvadora
 †Salvadora paleolineata
 †Sanctimus
 †Sanctimus stuartae – type locality for species
 †Scalopoides
 †Scalopoides isodens – or unidentified comparable form
 Scaphiopus
 †Scaptohyus
 †Scaptohyus altidens – type locality for species
 †Schaubeumys
 †Schaubeumys clivosus
 †Schaubeumys galbreathi
 †Schaubeumys grangeri – type locality for species
 †Schizodontomys
 †Schizodontomys harkseni
 †Scottimus
 †Scottimus exiguus
 †Scottimus lophatus
 †Semotelus – tentative report
  †Sespia
 †Sespia nitida – type locality for species
 †Sinclairella
 †Sinclairella dakotensis
 Sorex
 †Sorex cinereus
 Spea
 †Spea neuter – type locality for species
 Spermophilus
  †Stegomastodon
 †Stegomastodon mirificus
  †Steneofiber
 †Steneofiber fossor
 †Steneofiber gradatus
 †Stibarus
 †Stibarus obtusilobus
 †Stibarus quadricuspis
 Strix
 †Strix dakota – type locality for species
  †Stylemys
 †Stylemys nebrascensis
  †Subhyracodon
 †Subhyracodon mitis
 †Subhyracodon occidentalis
 †Sunkahetanka
 †Sunkahetanka geringensis
 Sylvilagus
 †Sylvilagus floridanus

T

  Tapirus
  †Teleoceras
 †Teleoceras major
 †Teleodus – type locality for genus
 †Teleodus avus – type locality for species
 †Temperocastor
 †Temperocastor valentinensis
 †Tenudomys
 †Tenudomys macdonaldi – type locality for species
 Thamnophis
 †Thamnophis sirtalis
 †Thinohyus
 Thomomys
 †Tisisthenes
 †Tisisthenes parvus
  †Titanotylopus
 †Trigenicus
 †Trigenicus profectus
  †Trigonias
 †Trigonias osborni
 †Trigonias wellsi – type locality for species
 †Trilaccogaulus
 †Trilaccogaulus ovatus
 †Triletes
 †Triletes velus – type locality for species
 †Tylionomys
 †Tylionomys woodi
 Tympanuchus
 †Tympanuchus stirtoni – type locality for species
 †Tyrannomys
 †Tyrannomys harkseni

U

 †Ursavus
 †Ustatochoerus
 †Ustatochoerus medius

W

 †Wilsoneumys – tentative report
 †Wilsoneumys planidens
 †Wilsonosorex
 †Wilsonosorex bateslandensis
 †Woodoceras – type locality for genus
 †Woodoceras brachyops – type locality for species

X

 †Xenochelys
 †Xenochelys formosa – type locality for species

Z

  Zapus
 †Zapus sykesae
 Zelkova
 †Zelkova planeroides

References
 

South Dakota
Cenozoic